Isla de Aves (Spanish for "Island of Birds" or "Birds Island"), or Aves Island, is a Federal Dependency of Venezuela. It has been the subject of numerous territorial disputes (now resolved) with the United States (through the Guano Islands Act of 1856), neighboring independent islands, such as Dominica, and European mother countries of surrounding dependent islands, such as the Netherlands, or the United Kingdom.

Under a particular interpretation of the United Nations Convention on the Law of the Sea, it could be classified as a rock, which would only give Venezuela a twelve nautical mile economic zone. However, Venezuela claims it is an island, which grants it a  exclusive economic zone. Mostly sand, a small portion has some scrubby vegetation. It is sometimes completely submerged during hurricanes.

Impact of hurricanes 
For some time the island has been in danger of eroding altogether, and Venezuelan authorities are considering ways to protect it, along with the territorial claims to the Caribbean Sea which radiate from Isla de Aves. The impact of Hurricane Allen in the 1980 Atlantic hurricane season divided it into two parts, but accretions of coral have subsequently reunited it. On August 17, 2007, the force of Hurricane Dean severely eroded the island.

Environment
The island is a resting and breeding place for seabirds and the green sea turtle (Chelonia mydas). Its low profile makes it a hazard to navigation, and many ships have been wrecked here.

Amateur radio "entity"
Aves Island is a particularly rare amateur radio "entity", under the ITU prefix YV0. A 2006 expedition by operators to the island required 14 years of planning. Though one member suffered a fatal heart attack, over 42,000 contacts were made during their week-long stay.

History

The island was most likely discovered by Avaro Sanzze in 1584, though it was not settled. It was subsequently claimed for Great Britain, Spain, Portugal and the Netherlands. Throughout the 17th, 18th and 19th centuries, the inhabitants of the Dutch islands Saint Eustatius and Saba regularly visited Aves to collect turtle and bird eggs.

In 1854, a U.S. captain discovered the abundant quantities of guano on Aves and systematic collection started not long after. Both the Dutch and Venezuelan authorities found out and protested. The Dutch sent a warship to Aves. Its captain found Americans loading guano. He informed them that the Dutch considered Aves to belong to the Netherlands.

The island was once again involved in controversy in 1857 when three Boston men, "Mesers Shelton, Samson and Tappan", were in a dispute with the Venezuelan government after they "annexed" the island "which they had discovered in an abandoned condition"; this was done in accordance with the recently passed United States Guano Islands Act.

In the meantime, in 1859, the Administrator of St. Eustatius granted a concession to collect guano on Aves to ‘Edward Green, Kean & Co.’ in Baltimore at f. 2.50 per ton. He decided that “even though Aves was never permanently settled by the Dutch, the inhabitants of Statia and Saba had made use of the island longer than anyone can remember,” which “constituted proof of possession.” He gave a provisionary concession and asked the Governor in Curaçao to confirm. The Governor, meanwhile, had received a request to mine guano on Aves from a group of businessmen on Dutch St. Maarten, “who had assured themselves that Aves was recognized as a possession of the Dutch government.”

The Dutch authorities on Curaçao, under whom St. Eustatius and Saba fell, sat down with the Venezuelans and together decided to find a mutually acceptable sovereign to decide about the ownership of Aves Island. The Queen of Spain was accepted by both parties, and in 1865 Isabella II ruled on the issue, deciding in favor of the Venezuelans.

However, Isabella's judgment acknowledged the time honored rights of the inhabitants of the Dutch islands St. Eustatius, Saba and St. Maarten to fish in the waters around Aves. As this was the main issue the Dutch had, they accepted the ruling. Later, some Dutch historians argued that Isabella's advisors could have mixed up Aves with Las Aves Archipelago lying between Bonaire and Los Roques, just off the coast of Venezuela.

From 1878 to 1912, the island was again occupied by American guano miners until supplies were exhausted.

Isla de Aves was included in Venezuela's territorial reorganization done by President Joaquín Crespo in 1895. By 1905, Isla de Aves was a municipality called "Municipio Oriental" part of Colón Federal Territory.

In 1950, a Venezuelan Navy fleet consisting of two patrol boats and one transport boat were sent to take control of the island with a group of soldiers.

On June 2, 1978, the Venezuelan Navy were sent to set up a scientific naval base named Simón Bolívar on the lee (west) side near the southern tip of the island, constructed as a platform built on stilts partially in the water, which was permanently inhabited by a group of scientists and military personnel.

United States—Venezuela Maritime Boundary Treaty
On March 28, 1978, Venezuela, using Aves Island as its reference, agreed to its maritime borders with the U.S. between Aves Island and Puerto Rico in the United States–Venezuela Maritime Boundary Treaty; this treaty came into force on 24 November 1980 after it was ratified by both parties.

Agreement with France
On June 17, 1980, Venezuela agreed with France that longitude 62°48′52″ W should be the maritime boundary between Aves Island and Guadeloupe and Martinique.

2006 Dominica and Venezuela informal agreement
During a visit to Venezuela, Dominica’s Prime Minister Roosevelt Skerrit, in June 2006, stated that Aves Island belongs to Venezuela, ending the territorial claim.

Historical maps

See also

 Ankoko Island (another disputed territory involving Venezuela)
 Exclusive economic zone
 Federal Dependencies of Venezuela
 List of marine molluscs of Venezuela
 List of sponges of Venezuela
 List of territorial disputes

References

External links
 Bird Island: time to act Editorial on the Commonwealth of Dominica taking steps to reclaim sovereignty over the island.
 
 2006 amateur radio activity, including pictures
 YW0A 4M5DX Group Amateur Radio DX Pedition to Aves Island 2014
 YX0V Amateur Radio DX Pedition Aves Island 2016

Articles and papers
 "Island' talk for Caricom, Venezuela (July 7, 2006) Barbados NationNews
 OECS searching for Bird Island solution (March 16, 2006) Caribbean Net News
 Shock over Bird Island (November 10, 2005) Barbados Advocate News
 Drama over Bird Island (November 10, 2005) Barbados Advocate News
 OECS raps Caracas' claim to island (November 9, 2005) Barbados NationNews
 Caricom to meet over Aves Island (October 24, 2005) Barbados NationNews
 History proves Venezuelan ownership of Isla de Aves
 VicePresident Rangel thinks that the "empire" is behind claim to Aves Island

IUCN Category IV
Federal Dependencies of Venezuela
Islands of the West Caribbean
Aves
Territorial disputes of Venezuela
Bird Island
Uninhabited islands of Venezuela
Extreme points of Venezuela
Caribbean islands claimed under the Guano Islands Act